Lodderia eumorpha cookiana is a subspecies of minute sea snail or micromollusc, a marine gastropod mollusc in the family Skeneidae.

Description
The height of the shell attains 1.1 mm, its diameter 1.2 mm.

Distribution
This marine species is endemic to New Zealand and found off Chatham Rise.

References

 Powell A. W. B., New Zealand Mollusca, William Collins Publishers Ltd, Auckland, New Zealand 1979 

eumorpha cookiana
Gastropods of New Zealand